The Heart of Christmas is the first holiday studio album by Christian contemporary/pop-rock musician Matthew West. It was released on October 4, 2011 through Sparrow Records. The album was produced by Brown Bannister and Pete Kipley. The album has achieved commercial charting successes, as well as, it has garnered critical acclamation.

Background
The album released on October 4, 2011 by Sparrow Records, and it was produced by Brown Bannister along with Pete Kipley. This was the first Christmas album from Matthew West.

Music and lyrics
At CCM Magazine, Grace S. Aspinwall noted that the album has "just the right balance of big-band style holiday classics and well crafted modern songs." Stella Redburn of Cross Rhythms commented that West has a "strong but flexible voice that works well in these up-beat arrangements". At The Christian Music Review Blog, Jonathan Kemp was "captivated" by his voice. In addition, Allmusic's Jon O'Brien wrote that the release "justifies West's reputation as one of the most dependable voices in contemporary Christian pop."

Critical reception

The Heart of Christmas garnered critical acclaim from music critics. At CCM Magazine, Grace S. Aspinwall rated the album four stars, and called the album West has created a "stunning" Christmas album. Stella Redburn of Cross Rhythms rated the album eight out of ten squares, and said she would suggest it to a listener as a Christmas album that is eccentric. At Louder Than the Music, Rich Smith rated the album a perfect five stars, and commented that West has imbued the album with the correct Christmas spirit, which proclaimed was "fantastic." Jonathan Kemp of The Christian Music Review Blog rated the album four-and-a-half stars out of five, and evoked that West has made a great Christmas album unlike some artist. At Alpha Omega News, Tom Frigoli graded the album an A, and stated West really knows the meaning of this special time of year. Tyler Hess of Christian Music Zine rated the album three-and-a-half out of five stars, and alluded to how the album has a "few hints of spice and personality" that help distinguish it from the rest. However, Allmusic's Jon O'Brien rated it three stars, which was the only mixed review, and felt that with respect to the album it "doesn't exactly break any new ground, but it's a heart-warming affair".

Track listing

Personnel 
 Matthew West – lead vocals 
 Jeff Pardo – acoustic piano (1-5, 9, 11, 12), backing vocals (1), band director
 Pete Kipley – programming (1-5, 9, 11, 12), guitars (1-5, 9, 11, 12)
 Tim Lauer – keyboards (6)
 Ben Shive – acoustic piano (6)
 Blair Masters – keyboards (8)
 Matt Stanfield – programming (8)
 Sam Mizell – programming (10), string arrangements (10)
 Courtlan Clement – guitars (1-5, 9, 11, 12), backing vocals (1)
 Tom Bukovac – electric guitars (6)
 Jerry McPherson – electric guitars (8, 10)
 Paul Franklin – steel guitar (6)
 Dave Childress – bass (1, 3, 4, 9, 12), backing vocals (1)
 Richard Brinsfield – upright bass (2, 5, 11)
 Tony Lucido – bass (6, 8)
 Dustin Rorher – drums (1-5, 9, 11, 12)
 Will Sayles – drums (6)
 Dan Needham – drums (8)
 Eric Darken – percussion (8, 10)
 F. Reid Shippen – percussion (8)
 David Davidson – string arrangements (3, 5, 9), strings (10)
 The Nashville String Machine – strings (3, 5, 9)
 Joey Leverage – backing vocals (1)
 Joel West – backing vocals (1)
 Laura Licatta – backing vocals (2)
 Vince Gill – backing vocals (4)
 Amy Grant – lead and harmony vocals (8)
 Mandisa – lead and harmony vocals (10)
 Jerard Woods – backing vocals (11)
 Jovaun Woods – backing vocals (11)

Production 
 Pete Kipley – producer (1-6, 9, 11, 12), recording (1-5, 9, 11, 12)
 Brown Bannister – producer (6, 8, 10), recording (8, 10)
 Chance Scoggins – vocal producer (10)
 Brad O'Donnell – A&R 
 Jess Chambers – A&R administration 
 Andy Hunt – recording (1-6, 9, 11, 12)
 Bobby Shin – recording (1-5, 9, 11, 12)
 Steve Bishir – recording (10)
 F. Reid Shippen – mixing (1-6, 8-12)
 Erik "Keller" Jahner – mix assistant (1-5, 9, 11, 12)
 Buckley Miller – mix assistant (8, 10)
 Warren David – digital editing (1-5, 9, 11, 12)
 Dustin Wise – digital editing (1-5, 9, 11, 12)
 Aaron Sternke – digital editing (8, 10)
 Bill Whittington – digital editing (8, 10)
 Greg Calbi – mastering 
 Jan Cook – art direction
 Matt Lehman – design 
 Reid Rolls – photography 
 Amber Lehman – stylist 
 Joel West – management 
 Mixed at Robot Lemon (Nashville, Tennessee).
 Mastered at Sterling Sound (New York City, New York).

Charts

References

2011 Christmas albums
Matthew West albums
Sparrow Records albums
Albums produced by Brown Bannister
Christmas albums by American artists
Pop Christmas albums